This is a list of films featuring the United States Space Force and its predecessor, Air Force Space Command.

The United States Space Force was established on December 20, 2019, but in some cases a United States service branch of that name had been featured in popular culture decades earlier, projecting the future establishment of such a branch.

List of films

References

See also

 Ad Astra, film released on August 29, 2019 and featuring United States Space Command, reestablished on the same day
 Anti-war film
 Cinema of the United States
 List of war films and TV specials
 Propaganda
 War film

American film-related lists
 
Lists of films by common content
Films